Romanos may refer to:

Romanos, Aragon, a municipality in the province of Zaragoza, in Aragon. 
Romanos the Melodist, early medieval Greek poet and saint
Romanos I Lekapenos (870–948),  Byzantine Emperor from 920 to 944
Romanos II (938–963), Byzantine Emperor from 959–963)
Romanos III Argyros (968–1034), Byzantine emperor from 1028 to 1034
Romanos IV Diogenes ( – 1072),  Byzantine emperor who reigned from 1068 to 1071
Romanos Kourkouas,  Byzantine aristocrat and senior military leader of the mid-10th century
Romanos Melikian (1883–1935), Armenian composer

See also
 Romano (disambiguation)
Romanus (disambiguation), hellenized as Romanos, the name of several people